James Marcelin (born 13 June 1986) is a Haitian professional footballer who last played for Canadian club FC Edmonton.

Club career

Early career
Born in Saint-Marc, Haiti, Marcelin began his career with Roulado when he was sixteen, helping the team win the Ligue Haïtienne title in 2003, before moving to Racing Club Haïtien in 2007.

Puerto Rico Islanders
In 2008, he moved to the Puerto Rico Islanders of the USL First Division, where he saw limited playing time in league games. However, he played heavily in Puerto Rico's 2008–09 CONCACAF Champions League games.  In 2009, he became a regular first team starter.

Portland Timbers
On 11 February 2010, the Portland Timbers (USL) of the USSF D2 Pro League signed Marcelin to a one-year contract for the 2010 season where he quickly established himself as a regular first-team starter. He continued with the Timbers when they joined Major League Soccer in 2011, appearing in most games of the season and starting in several ones. Marcelin was waived by Portland on 25 April 2012 for 'non soccer related reasons'.

FC Dallas
He signed with fellow MLS club FC Dallas just over a week later on 4 May 2012 for the rest of the season.

Fort Lauderdale Strikers
In July 2014 he signed with Fort Lauderdale Strikers of the North American Soccer League.

On 16 December 2014, Marcelin signed with Sporting Kansas City of Major League Soccer but was waived in the preseason.

He re-signed with Fort Lauderdale on 3 March 2015.

North Carolina FC
Marcelin was traded by Fort Lauderdale to Carolina RailHawks in exchange for Neil Hlavaty on 30 December 2015.

Miami United
In June 2018, Marcelin signed with National Premier Soccer League side Miami United FC.

FC Edmonton
On 22 February 2019, Marcelin joined Canadian Premier League side FC Edmonton. He made his debut for the Eddies on May 4 against Valour FC playing the full 90 minutes in a 2-1 victory. At the end of the season Edmonton announced that Marcelin would not be returning to the team in 2020.

International career
In 2006, Marcelin appeared for the Haitian U-21 national team. In 2007 and 2009, Marcelin played for the Haiti national football team at the Gold Cup. On 8 June 2016, Marcelin scored a historic goal for Haiti, making it the first goal scored for Haiti in a Copa América and the first Haitian goal scored against Brazil.

Career statistics

International goals
As of match played 8 June 2016. Haiti score listed first, score column indicates score after each Marcelin goal.

Honours
Roulado
Ligue Haïtienne: 2003

Puerto Rico Islanders
Commissioner's Cup: 2008

Individual
NASL Best XI: 2015

References

External links
 
 
 

1986 births
Living people
Association football midfielders
Haitian footballers
People from Saint-Marc
Haitian expatriate footballers
Expatriate footballers in Puerto Rico
Haitian expatriate sportspeople in Puerto Rico
Expatriate soccer players in the United States
Haitian expatriate sportspeople in the United States
Expatriate footballers in Antigua and Barbuda
Haitian expatriate sportspeople in Antigua and Barbuda
Expatriate soccer players in Canada
Haitian expatriate sportspeople in Canada
Racing CH players
Puerto Rico Islanders players
Portland Timbers (2001–2010) players
Portland Timbers players
FC Dallas players
Antigua Barracuda F.C. players
Fort Lauderdale Strikers players
North Carolina FC players
FC Edmonton players
Ligue Haïtienne players
USL First Division players
USSF Division 2 Professional League players
Major League Soccer players
USL Championship players
National Premier Soccer League players
Canadian Premier League players
Haiti international footballers
2007 CONCACAF Gold Cup players
2015 CONCACAF Gold Cup players
Copa América Centenario players